STEER could refer to:
STEER, part of the Energy policy of the European Union
An analysis of socio-cultural, technological, economic, ecological, and regulatory factors affecting a business, similar to a PEST analysis